Oleggio Castello is a comune (municipality) in the Province of Novara in the Italian region of Piedmont, located about  northeast of Turin and about  north of Novara.

References

External links

 Official website

Cities and towns in Piedmont